Hrod may refer to:

 Hroðr, Norse mythology
 Hrod (toponymy), Slavic toponyms